Annie Q. is an American actress, known professionally as Annie Q. Riegel as of 2022. She is best known for her portrayal of Christine in the HBO television series The Leftovers and Sophie Hicks in the Netflix comedy-drama Alex Strangelove. She also appeared in the "School Spirit" episode of the Hulu anthology series Into the Dark.

Personal life and family 
Annie Q. Riegel was born in Brooklyn, New York. She grew up between Beijing, China and New York City, New York, speaking both Mandarin Chinese and English with her family at home. Her acceptance into Fiorello H. LaGuardia High School of Music & Art and Performing Arts began her interest in acting. She went on to attend New York University Stern School of Business and Tisch School of the Arts for finance and film.

Career
As a child, Annie Q. Riegel appeared in several commercials, short films and episodic television work. After graduating high school, she made her stage debut in 2012 playing the title role in Tony Award-winning playwright David Henry Hwang's Golden Child revival at the Signature Theatre. In 2013, she was cast as a series regular in the HBO television series The Leftovers. In 2014, she appeared in Marc Lawrence (filmmaker)'s romantic comedy The Rewrite. In 2018, she co-starred in the Ben Stiller–produced Netflix film Alex Strangelove. In 2019, she was announced as one of the cast members of Into the Darks back-to-school installment, "School Spirit", which premiered on Hulu two months later. She is the first Asian American lead in Blumhouse production history. In January 2022, she was cast in a recurring role as Juliette Tan for Kung Fu (2021–present), a reboot of the 1972 series of the same name.  She is an AudioFile magazine Earphones Award–winning audiobook narrator.

Filmography

Film

Television

Video games

Theatre

References

External links

Fiorello H. LaGuardia High School alumni
New York University alumni
21st-century American actresses
American actresses of Chinese descent
Living people
Year of birth missing (living people)
Actresses from New York City